Colour in the Creek is a 1985 Australian children's TV series. It was made with a budget of $1.6 million and was adapted from the novel by Margaret Paice.

References

External links

Colour in the Creek at AustLit

Nine Network original programming
Australian children's television series
1985 Australian television series debuts